Zhao Shuang (born 21 June 1990) is a basketball player for China women's national basketball team. She is part of the squad for the 2012 Summer Olympics.

References

1990 births
Living people
Chinese women's basketball players
Basketball players at the 2012 Summer Olympics
Olympic basketball players of China
Basketball players from Heilongjiang
People from Mudanjiang
Shenyang Army Golden Lions players
Shooting guards